The Monti Simbruini are a mountain range in central Italy, a part of Apennines mountain system.

The 'Simbruini' name derives from Simbruvium, a lake formed by the river Anio, situated in the territory of the Aequi; it may derive from Latin sub imbribus ("under the rain"). They are also popularly known as "Rome's Alps".

Geography
The Monti Simbruini mark a part of the border between Abruzzo and Lazio. The Monti Simbruini border with the Monti Cantari and the Carseolani Mountains.

The headwaters of the River Aniene are in the range. The Liri river, one of the main Italian rivers, also originates in the mountains (Petrella Liri).

On the Lazio side of the mountain range, between the provinces of Rome and Frosinone, a natural park has been established, the Parco naturale regionale Monti Simbruini.

Regional Park of the Monti Simbruini
The Regional Park of the Monti Simbruini, which also includes the Monti Cantari range, was established in 1983.

The regional park and mountains include the comuni (villages) of: Camerata Nuova, Cervara di Roma (Campaegli), Filettino, Jenne, Subiaco (Monte Livata), Trevi nel Lazio, and Vallepietra.

Natural history

Habitats
Habitats in the Monti Simbruini include: the Apennine deciduous montane forests ecoregion, in the temperate broadleaf and mixed forests biome;
and the Italian sclerophyllous and semi-deciduous forests ecoregion, in the Mediterranean forests, woodlands, and scrub biome.

Flora

European Beech — Fagus sylvatica (primary tree species)
Sweet Chestnut — Castanea sativa
Common Hazel — Corylus avellana
Downy Oak — Quercus pubescens
Gentian — Gentiana species
European Hornbeam — Carpinus betulus
Lily — Lilium species
Iris - Iris marsica and Iris germanica
Montpellier Maple — Acer monspessulanum
Red raspberry — Rubus idaeus
Alpine currant — Ribes alpinum
European mountain-ash — European mountain-ash (aka: Rowan, European Rowan)
Dwarf Whitebeam — Sorbus chamaemespilus
Strawberry tree — Arbutus unedo
Yew — Taxus baccata
Terebinth — Pistacia terebinthus
Lingonberry — Vaccinium vitis-idaea
Violet species

Fauna

Aesculapian snake
Barn owl
Beech marten
Boar
Brown trout
Carrion crow
Green whip snake — Coluber viridiflavus
Crested porcupine
Edible dormouse
Eurasian badger
Eurasian jay
Eurasian sparrowhawk
European hedgehog
Fox
Golden eagle
Northern goshawk
House mouse
Italian wolf
Least weasel
Little owl
Roe deer
Marsican brown bear — Ursus arctos marsicanus
Salamandrina terdigitata
Tawny owl
Vipera aspis
Wild cat

References

External links

Parks.it: Monti Simbruini Regional Park
Tibursuperbum.it: Monti Simbruini Regional Park 

Mountain ranges of Italy
Mountain ranges of the Apennines
Mountains of Abruzzo
Mountains of Lazio
Parks in Abruzzo
Parks in Lazio
Monti Simbruini
Protected areas of the Apennines